The BAT F.K.25 Basilisk was a prototype British fighter aircraft of the First World War. A single engined biplane intended to meet a requirement to replace the Sopwith Snipe, the Basilisk was unsuccessful, only three being built.

Development and design
In 1918, the British Air Ministry issued the RAF Type 1 specification for a single-seat fighter, powered by the new (and untried) ABC Dragonfly air cooled radial engine to replace the Sopwith Snipe. To meet this requirement, Frederick Koolhoven, (formerly of Armstrong Whitworth Aircraft and before that Deperdussin) chief designer of the British Aerial Transport Company of London, designed the F.K. 25 Basilisk.

Like Koolhovens earlier F.K.23 Bantam, the Basilisk was a two-bay biplane with a wooden monocoque fuselage, but was larger and heavier to accommodate the larger engine and the equipment required by the Specification.  Armament was two Vickers machine guns mounted ahead of the pilot, and enclosed in a large fairing that formed the upper coaming of the pilot's cockpit.

Three prototypes were ordered in early 1918, and the first one flew in September 1918. It was destroyed on 3 May 1919 when attempting to break the World altitude record, its engine catching fire and BAT's test pilot, Peter Legh, being killed after he jumped clear.  The second and third prototype were fitted with modified, horn balanced ailerons, with the second prototype tested at Martlesham Heath in October 1919.  While its performance was good (although not as good as claimed by BAT), the Dragonfly engine was hopelessly unreliable, with further development or production abandoned earlier in the year, and the Basilisk was abandoned when Koolhoven left BAT at the end of 1919.

Specifications (Second prototype)

See also

Notes

References

 
 "The Late Peter Legh." Flight, 8 May 1919, No. 641 Vol. XI. p. 616.
 "Some "B.A.T." Aeroplanes". Flight, 1 January 1920, pp. 18, 19.
 Bruce, J.M. British Aeroplanes 1914-18. London:Putnam, 1957.
 Bruce, J.M. War Planes of the First World War: Fighters Volume One. London:Macdonald, 1965.
 Lewis, Peter. The British Fighter since 1912. London:Putnam, Fourth edition 1979. .
 Mason, Francis K. The British Fighter since 1912. Annapolis, USA:Naval Institute Press, 1992. .

External links

 BAT FK-25 Basilisk (in Russian)

1910s British fighter aircraft
Biplanes
Military aircraft of World War I
Koolhoven aircraft
Single-engined tractor aircraft
Aircraft first flown in 1918